Nicholas Stafford (1691–1762) was an Anglican bishop in the Church of Ireland in the early seventeenth century.

A former Chancellor of  Ferns and Leighlin he was Bishop of Ferns and Leighlin from 1601 until his death in 1604." The History and Antiquities of the County of Carlow " Ryan, J. p139: Dublin; Richard Moore;1833

References

Bishops of Ferns and Leighlin
18th-century Anglican bishops in Ireland
1691 births
1762 deaths